NewPark Mall is a  super-regional mall in Newark, California. Opened in August 1980, it currently houses 119 stores. It serves the Tri-City area (Fremont, Newark and Union City). The mall underwent extensive renovations that were completed in early 2017. Among the additions are a 12-screen AMC movie complex with an IMAX screen and an elaborate new glass-walled restaurant area with views through the entire property.

The Marin Farmers Markets nonprofit organization operates a farmers market on the mall property on Sunday. The mall is adjacent to the Newark campus of Ohlone College and Newark Memorial High School.

Anchor stores 
The mall opened in 1980 with Macy's and Sears. A 1985 expansion added Mervyns, which relocated from the Fremont Hub. Emporium-Capwell was added as in 1989, followed by JCPenney in 1991. The Emporium store closed and became Target in 1996. Old Navy, which also move from Fremont Hub, was added in 2000. It closed in 2005 and became Steve & Barry's in 2007. After Mervyns closed in 2007, it became Burlington Coat Factory in 2010. Target relocated  to the Pacific Commons Shopping Center in Fremont, California in 2012 and was replaced by AMC Theatres on January 28, 2016.

In 2015, Sears Holdings spun off 235 properties, including the Sears at NewPark Mall, into Seritage Growth Properties.

Two pizza restaurants opened in 2017 as part of the ongoing renovations taking place at NewPark Mall.

On June 28, 2018 Sears announced that its store would be closing as part of a plan to close 78 stores nationwide. The store closed in September 2018.

JCPenney closed in April 2019 as part of a plan to close 27 underperforming stores.

Burlington moved to Pacific Commons Shopping Center in 2020.

In July 2021, The Newark City Council and Brookfield Properties approved plans for a 319-unit apartment complex that will be built on the Mall's property along with a new Costco being built at the JCPenney and Burlington Coat Factory site. The finishing date is unknown.

This leaves Macy's as the remaining anchor, along with AMC Theatres, John's Incredible Pizza Co., and 24 Hour Fitness.

References

Shopping malls established in 1980
Shopping malls in the San Francisco Bay Area
Shopping malls in Alameda County, California
Newark, California
Brookfield Properties
1980 establishments in California